Mitch Hallahan (born 23 August 1992) is a former professional Australian rules footballer who played with the Hawthorn Football Club and Gold Coast Suns in the Australian Football League (AFL).

AFL career

Hallahan was an all round junior sportsman, he learnt to box in a Rye gym. He won a state title in the Victorian cadet boxing championships. Hallahan was a co-captain of the Dandenong Stingrays team in the TAC Cup in 2010, but an ankle injury during the season caused a drop-off in form.

Hawthorn (2011–2014)

In 2012 and 2013, Hallahan played exclusively with Hawthorn's , Box Hill Hawks. In 2013 he won the J.J. Liston Trophy in a three-way tie with Steve Clifton (North Ballarat) and Jordan Schroder (Geelong), all on 17 votes.

Hallahan was selected to make his debut for Hawthorn against  at the MCG on Easter Monday, 2014. He was named on the interchange bench.

Gold Coast (2015–2017) 
On 16 October 2014, after struggling to break into the premier Hawthorn team during the regular season, Hallahan was traded to the Gold Coast Football Club. Hallahan was delisted by Gold Coast in September 2017.

Statistics

|- style=background:#EAEAEA
| 2011 ||  || 38
| 0 || — || — || — || — || — || — || — || — || — || — || — || — || — || — || 0
|-
| 2012 ||  || 38
| 0 || — || — || — || — || — || — || — || — || — || — || — || — || — || — || 0
|- style=background:#EAEAEA
| 2013 ||  || 38
| 0 || — || — || — || — || — || — || — || — || — || — || — || — || — || — || 0
|-
| 2014 ||  || 38
| 6 || 2 || 4 || 42 || 63 || 105 || 18 || 24 || 0.3 || 0.7 || 7.0 || 10.5 || 17.5 || 3.0 || 4.0 || 0
|- style=background:#EAEAEA
| 2015 ||  || 14
| 12 || 3 || 2 || 134 || 94 || 228 || 38 || 56 || 0.3 || 0.2 || 11.2 || 7.8 || 19.0 || 3.2 || 4.7 || 0
|-
| 2016 ||  || 14
| 5 || 1 || 1 || 45 || 44 || 89 || 6 || 16 || 0.2 || 0.2 || 9.0 || 8.8 || 17.8 || 1.2 || 3.2 || 0
|- style=background:#EAEAEA
| 2017 ||  || 14
| 3 || 1 || 1 || 32 || 33 || 65 || 13 || 11 || 0.3 || 0.3 || 10.7 || 11.0 || 21.7 || 4.3 || 3.7 || 0
|- class="sortbottom"
! colspan=3| Career
! 26 !! 7 !! 8 !! 253 !! 234 !! 487 !! 75 !! 107 !! 0.3 !! 0.3 !! 9.7 !! 9.0 !! 18.7 !! 2.9 !! 4.1 !! 0
|}

Honours and achievements
Team
 VFL premiership player: 2013

Individual
 J.J. Liston Trophy: 2013

References

External links

Hawthorn Football Club players
Box Hill Football Club players
1992 births
Living people
J. J. Liston Trophy winners
Dandenong Stingrays players
Australian rules footballers from Victoria (Australia)
Gold Coast Football Club players